Marsypianthes is a genus of flowering plants in the family Lamiaceae, first described in 1833. It is native to South America, Central America, the West Indies, and southern Mexico.

Species
 Marsypianthes burchellii Epling - Brazil
 Marsypianthes chamaedrys (Vahl) Kuntze. - from southern Mexico and the West Indies south to Argentina
 Marsypianthes foliolosa Benth. - Brazil
 Marsypianthes hassleri Briq. - Paraguay, southern Brazil, Misiones Province of Argentina
 Marsypianthes montana Benth. - Brazil

References

Lamiaceae
Lamiaceae genera